The Public Access to Public Science (PAPs) public access to research funded by specific Federal agencies under the jurisdiction of the House Science committee, including National Aeronautics and Space Administration (NASA), the National Science Foundation (NSF), the National Institute of Standards and Technology (NIST) and the National Weather Service (NWS). The Bill was introduced to the 113th Congress by Congressman Jim Sensenbrenner (R.-WI.) and Congresswoman Eddie Bernice Johnson (D-TX) and was referred to the Subcommittee on Research and Technology December 13, 2013. It has been endorsed by the Association of Public and Land-grant Universities (APLU) and the Association of American Universities (AAU).

The bill is often compared to and discussed in conjunction with the Fair Access to Science and Technology Research Act (FASTR) bill, also introduced in 2013.

References

Congress.gov. H.R.3157 -- 113th Congress (2013-2014).
Meindertsma, Jessica. October 25, 2013. "Public Access Policies (Part 1): FASTER, PAPS, and the OSTP Directive." Ohio State University Libraries.
Sensenbrenner, Jim. September 6, 2016. "Give The Public What It Pays For: Scientific Research." Forbes.

External links
Full text of bill
Letter of endorsement
Notes on the Public Access to Public Science Act, Harvard Open Access Project
FASTR v PAPS

Open access (publishing)
United States federal communications legislation
Proposed legislation of the 113th United States Congress